All of Angola uses UTC+01:00 (West Africa Time), and has never observed Daylight saving time.

TZ database

References